Stuart Sikes is an American recording engineer.

He has won a Grammy Award in 2005 in the Best Country Album category for engineering the album Van Lear Rose by Loretta Lynn. He also produced critically acclaimed singer Cat Power's 2006 Shortlist Music Prize winning album The Greatest and has worked on albums by The White Stripes, Modest Mouse, Jets to Brazil, Dr. Zwig, The Walkmen, and The Promise Ring.

References

External links
Another GRAMMY Night For Full Sail Graduates!

American audio engineers
Grammy Award winners
Living people
Year of birth missing (living people)